Sam Hunt (born August 6, 1951, in Longview, Texas) is a former American football linebacker in the National Football League. He was drafted by the New England Patriots in the 15th round of the 1974 NFL Draft. He played college football at Stephen F. Austin State University.

Hunt also played for the Green Bay Packers. His younger brother Byron also played in the NFL.

External links
New England Patriots bio

1951 births
Living people
American football linebackers
Stephen F. Austin Lumberjacks football players
New England Patriots players
Green Bay Packers players
People from Longview, Texas